Oulu can refer to:

Astronomy
1512 Oulu (1939 FE), an asteroid

Places
Finland
Oulu, a city and municipality in Finland (Uleåborg)
Oulu Province, one of the provinces of Finland (Oulun lääni/Uleåborgs län)
University of Oulu, a university located in Oulu
Oulu railway station
Oulu Airport
Port of Oulu
Oulujoki, a river 
Oulujärvi, a lake
United States
Oulu, Wisconsin, a town
Oulu (community), Wisconsin, an unincorporated community